This is a list of geographic acronyms and initialisms. That is, it's a list of the names of cities, towns, lakes, and other geographic places that are derived from acronyms. Acronyms are abbreviations formed by the initial letter or letters of the words that make up a multi-word term.

For the most part, the geographic names in this list were derived from three or more other names or words. Those derived from only two names are usually considered portmanteaus and can be found in the List of geographic portmanteaus. However, there are exceptions to this two/three rule in both lists, so it is more of a guideline than a hard-and-fast rule.

Regions

Countries 

 Pakistan — Punjab, Afghania, Kashmir, (I for pronunciation), Sindh, and BaluchisTAN, the northern provinces of British India. The name also means Land of the Pure in Urdu and Persian.

Provinces 

Malampa Province, Vanuatu — islands that make up the province: MALakula, AMbrym, PAama
Penama Province, Vanuatu — islands that make up the province: PENtecost, Ambae, MAewo
 Tafea Province, Vanuatu — five islands that comprise the province: Tanna, Aneityum, Futuna, Erromango and Aniwa

Other regions 

 Banzare Coast, Wilkes Land, Antarctica — British–Australian–New Zealand Antarctic Research Expedition
 Benelux — BElgium NEtherlands LUXembourg
 Calabarzon — the Southern Tagalog Mainland region of the Philippines, comprising five provinces: CAvite, LAguna, BAtangas, Rizal, and QueZON
 LoVeSe — three island groups in northern Norway: LOfoten, VEsterålen, and SEnja, often used in relation to the political issue of oil extraction in the region. "LoVe" is also a common variation, referring to just Lofoten and Vesterålen.
 Luzviminda — three island groups in the Philippines: LUZon, VIsayas, and MINDAnao
 Mimaropa, Philippines — provinces comprising the Southwestern Tagalog Region: MIndoro (East and West), MArinduque, ROmblon and PAlawan
 NEPA, a common nickname of NorthEastern PennsylvaniA
 NOVA — NOrthern VirginiA
 Shoshanguve, South Aftrica —  SOtho, SHAngaan, NGUni and VEnda, the languages of the peoples relocated to this township
Soccsksargen, Philippines — administrative region: SOuth Cotabato, Cotabato City, North Cotabato, Sultan Kudarat, SARangani and GENeral Santos City
 SOWEGA — SOuth WEst GeorgiA
 TAG Corner — Tennessee Alabama Georgia

Populated places

Cities and towns

Places named after companies 
Many of these places are former company towns.
Abanda, Alabama — Atlanta, Birmingham AND Atlantic Railroad
Alco, Louisiana — Alexandria Lumber COmpany
Alcoa, Tennessee — ALuminum COmpany of America
Alpoca, West Virginia — ALpha POCAhontas Coal Company
Ameagle, West Virginia — AMerican EAGLE Colliery
Asco, West Virginia — Atlantic Smokeless COal Company
Atco, Georgia — American Textile COmpany
Atco, New Jersey — Atlantic Transport COmpany
Ballico, California — BALLIntine COmpany
Becco, West Virginia — Bufalo Eagle Colliery COmpany
Cadomin, Alberta — CAnadian DOminion MINe
 Calavo Gardens, California — CALifornia AVOcado Growers Association
Caldor, California — CALifornia DOoR Company
Calgro, California — CALifornia GROwers Wineries
Calpack, California — CALifornia PACKing Corporation
Calpet, Wyoming — CALifornia PETroleum Company
Calwa, California — CALifornia Wine Association
Canora, Saskatchewan — CAnadian NOrthern RAilway
Ceepeecee, British Columbia — either Canadian Packing Corporation or California Packing Corporation, or likely first Canadian, then California
Charmco, West Virginia — CHARleston Milling COmpany
Cimic, Illinois — Chicago Illinois Midland Railroad, Illinois Central Railroad
 Cipsco Park, Illinois — Central Illinois Public Service COmpany
 Cleo, Oregon — A backwards acronym for Oregon Export Lumber Company
 Clinchco, Virginia — for both CLINCHfield Railroad and CLINCHfield Coal COrporation
Closplint, Kentucky — CLOver SPLINT Coal Company
Cofoco, West Virginia —  COal FOrk COal Company, now known as Coal, West Virginia
Colwich, Kansas — COLorado and WICHita Railroad Company
 Cominco, Saskatchewan — COnsolidated MINing and Smelting COmpany
 Copco, California — California Oregon Power COmpany
 Cumbo, West Virginia — CUMberland Valley Railroad, Baltimore and Ohio Railroad
Delanson, New York — DELaware ANd HudSON Railroad
 Domex, Saskatchewan — DOMe EXploration, Ltd.
Elco, Illinois — E. Levenworth and COmpany General Store (from the abbreviation "E. L. Co" stenciled on boxes in front of the store)
Falco, Alabama — Florida–Alabama Land COmpany
Gamerco, New Mexico — Gallup AMERican COal Company
 Gimco City, Indiana — General Insulation and Manufacturing COmpany (now part of Alexandria, Indiana)
Grenora, North Dakota — GREat NOrthern RAilway
Harco, Illinois — HARrisburg COlliery Coal Company
Herpoco, California —  HERcules POwder COmpany
Ioco, Port Moody, British Columbia — Imperial Oil COrporation or COmpany (actual name: Imperial Oil, Ltd.)
Irmulco, California — IRvine and MUir Lumber COmpany
Kayjay, Kentucky — Kentucky–Jellico Coal Company
 Kicco, Florida — Kissimmee Island Cattle COmpany
Kofa, Arizona — King OF Arizona Mine
Kyrock, Kentucky — KentuckY ROCK Asphalt Company
 Labuco, Alabama — LAcey–BUek Iron COmpany
 Lacjac, California — LAChman & JACobi
Latexo, Texas — LouisianA TEXas Orchard Company
Lobeco, South Carolina — LOng, BEllamy, and COmpany
Lorado, West Virginia — LORAin Coal and DOck Company 
Mercoal, Alberta — McLeod (E for pronunciation) River Hard COAL Company
Micco, West Virginia — Main Island Creek COal Company
Mico, Texas — Medina Irrigation COmpany
Mococo, California — MOuntain COpper COmpany
Mokane, Missouri — MissOuri KANsas and Eastern Railway
 Mopeco, California — MOhawk PEtroleum COmpany
Nacmine, Alberta — North America Collieries, Ltd. plus the word MINE
Naplate, Illinois — NAational PLATE Glass Company
Nolalu, Ontario — NOrthern LAnd LUmber Company
Norco, California — NORth COrona Land Company
Norco, Louisiana — New Orleans Refinery COmpany
 Norco, Saskatchewan — NORanda COmpany
 Norpak, North Dakota — NORthern PACific Railroad (with a K replacing the C)
Nyando, New York — New York AND Ottawa Railway, former station on the line; now known as Rooseveltown
 Ocapos, Arizona — A backwards acronym for SOuthern PAcific COmpany (i.e. Southern Pacific Railroad)
 Ohaton, Alberta — Osler, HAmmond, and NanTON, Winnipeg financial firm
Orenco, Oregon — OREgon Nursery COmpany
 Orseco, Oregon — ORegon SEcurities COmpany; name changed to Champion now historical 
Parco, Wyoming — Producers And Refiners COrporation
 Pennsuco, Florida — PENNsylvania SUgar COmpany
 Phosmico, Florida — PHOSphate MIning COmpany 
 Praco, Alabama — PRAtt Consolidated Coal COmpany
Raco, Michigan — Richardson & Avery COmpany
Raeco, Washington — Rodes, Appel, and Earnest plus COmpany
Reco, Alberta — REliance COal Company
Sasco, Arizona — Southern Arizona Smelter COmpany
Saspamco, Texas — San Antonio Sewer Pipe (A for pronunciation) Manufacturing COmpany
Seco, Kentucky — South East COal Company
Sedco Hills, California — South Elsinore Development COmpany
 Seroco, North Dakota — SEars ROebuck and COmpany
 Siboco, Oregon — SIuslaw BOom COmpany
Sterco, Alberta — STERling COllieries
 Stoil, California — STandard OIL Company (former location of a pumping station)
Sumica, Florida — Société Universelle des Mines, Industrie Commerce et Agriculture
Svit, Slovakia — Slovenské VIzkózové Továrne (English: "Slovak Viscose Works")
Talco, Texas — Texas, Arkansas, and Louisiana Candy COmpany (seen on a box of candy)
Tapco, Arizona — The Arizona Power COmpany
Tapoco, North Carolina — TAllassee POwer COmpany
 Tracoal, West Virginia — TRAce Fork COAL Company
Tumco, California — The United Mines COmpany
 Upalco, Utah — Utah Power And Light COmpany
 Vancorum, Colorado — VANadium CORporation of AMerica, with a substitution of a U for the A 
Vicco, Kentucky — Virginia Iron Coal and Coke COmpany
Weslaco, Texas — W. E. Stewart LAnd COmpany
Wevaco, West Virginia — WEst VirginiA COlliery Company
Wiscoal, Kentucky — WISconsin COAL Company
 Zimco, Alabama — ZImmerman Manufacturing COmpany

Places named after people 

 Aflex, Kentucky — A. F. LEckie (X instead of CK)
 Aitch, Pennsylvania — Aumen, Isett, Trexler, Crexwell, and Harker, town founders
 Alcolu, South Carolina — ALderman COldwell LUla; mill owner, friend, and eldest daughter, respectively
 Almadane, Louisiana — three early settlers: AL Damereal, MAnn Huddleston, and DAN Knight + E for euphony
 Anarene, Texas — ANnA LauRENE Graham, daughter of early pioneer J. M. Keen
Anco, Kentucky — ANderson COmbs, first postmaster
Arbyrd, Missouri — A. R. BYRD, landowner
 Archerwill, Saskatchewan — councilors ARCHie Hamilton Campbell and ERvie Edvin Hanson, and secretary-treasurer WILLiam S. Pierce of Barrier Valley Rural Municipality
 Arjay, Kentucky — R. J. Asher, coal operator
Armelgra, Alberta — ARthur MELville GRAce, engineer for the Canadian Pacific Railway
Arvida, Quebec — ARthur VIning DAvis, president of Aluminum Company of Canada
Awe, Kentucky — Anthony Wayne Everman, first postmaster
 Bahama, North Carolina — three leading families of the community: BAll, HArris, and MAngum 
 Balmorhea, Texas — BALcolm, MOrrow, RHEA, town founders
 Benld, Illinois — BEN L. Dorsey, early settler
 Bolada, Arizona — three family names: BOnes LAne DAndera
 Bresaylor, Saskatchewan — three founding families: BREmner, SAYers, and TayLOR
 Bromer, Indiana — early settlers: Boyd, Roll, Oldham, McCoy, Ellis, and Reid
 Bucoda, Missouri — early settlers: BUchanan, COburn, and DAvis
Bucoda, Washington — investors in local industry: J. M. BUckley, Samuel COulter, John B. DAvid
 Cabarton, Idaho — C. A. BARTON, official of the Boise Payette Lumber Company (a former company town of that company)
Cadams, Nebraska — C. ADAMS, local banker
 Chaney, Oklahoma — six family names: Carey, Hull, Adams, Nichols, Edmonds, Yarnold
 Charlo, Port Elizabeth, South Africa — CHARles LOvemore, landowner
 Comrey, Alberta — names of six early settlers: Columbus Larson, Ole Roen, Mons Roen, R. Rolfson, J. J. Everson, Ed Yager
 Dacono, Colorado — DAisy Baum, COra Van Vorhies and NOra Brooks
Delmar, Iowa — initials of six women on the first train to the new town: Della, Emma, Laura, Marie, Anna, and Rose.
Edmore, Michigan — EDwin MOoRE, the first settler of the village
Emida, Idaho — East, MIller, and DAwson, three early family names
 Eram, Oklahoma — four children of Ed Oates: Eugene, Roderick, Anthony, and Marie
 Ethanac, California — ETHAN A. Chase, landowner and political leader (town is now named Romoland, California)
Faloma, Oregon — Force Love Moore, three original land-owners, with added vowels
 Fastrill, Texas — F. F. FArrington, P. H. STRause, and Will HILL, postmaster and two lumbermen
Gamoca, West Virginia — GAuley, MOley, and CAmpbell
 Gathon, Illinois — Gallager, Adams, Tremblay, and Herzog (ON added by the post office)
 Geekabee Hill, Western Australia — George Kershaw Brown
 Germfask Township, Michigan —  town founders: John Grant, Matthew Edge, George Robinson, Thaddeus Mead, Dr. W. W. French, Ezekiel Ackley, Oscar (O.D.) Sheppard, and Hezekiah Knaggs
 Golah, New York — coined by Rev H. W. Howard from five local family names (names unknown)
 Hacoda, Alabama — HArt, COleman, DAvis, three local businessmen
Halbrite, Saskatchewan — three Canadian Pacific Railway engineers: HALl, BRuce, WhITE
 Helechawa, Kentucky — HELEn CHAse WAlbridge, daughter of W. Delancy Walbridge, first president of Ohio and Kentucky Railroad
Hemaruka, Alberta — daughters of A. E. Warren, General Manager of Canadian National Railway: HElen, MArgaret, RUth and KAthleen
Hisega, South Dakota — six women who built a camp site and country club at the location: Helen Scroggs, Ida Anding, Sadie Robinson, Ethel Brink, Grace Wasson, and Ada Pike
 Itmann, West Virginia — Isaac T. MANN, president of Pocahontas Consolidated Coal Company
 Jacam, Manitoba — J. A. CAMpbell, politician
 Jayem, Kentucky — John Marshall Robsion, Sr., congressman
Jay Em, Wyoming — Jim Moore, cattle rancher
 Jayenne, West Virginia — Johnson Newlon Camden, US senator
 Jaype, Idaho — John P. Weyerhaeuser Jr., president of Potlatch Lumber Company
 Jetson, Kentucky — J. E. Taylor and SON, co-owners of a local business
 Kinnorwood, Illinois — H. L. KINney, George H. NORris, Robert P. WOODworth, land owners
 Klej Grange, Maryland — Joseph William Drexel's four daughters: Katherine, Lucy, Elizabeth, and Josephine
 Kragon, Kentucky — K. RAGON, founder and president of the Kentucky Wood Products Company
 Lecoma, Missouri — three local merchants: LEnox, COmstock, and MArtin 
 Le Mars, Iowa — eight women from Cedar Rapids on a railroad excursion who were asked to name the town. Two of the letters, L and M, represent two women each: Lucy Ford and Laura Walker; Elizabeth Underhill or Ellen Cleghorn; Mary Weare and Martha Weare; Adeline Swain; Rebecca Smith; Sarah Reynolds.
Lookeba, Oklahoma — LOwe, KElly and BAker, town founders (with an extra O)
Mabana, Washington — MABel ANderson, daughter of an early settler, plus A for pronunciation
 Mabscott, West Virginia — MABel SCOTT
 Maleb, Alberta — initials of the Bowen family: Morley, Amy, Lorne, Elizabeth, Bowen; disagreement over whether these are the initials of the parents or the children
 Maljamar, New Mexico — MALcolm, JAnet, MARgaret, children of William Mitchell, oil operator
 Marenisco Township, Michigan — either MARy ENId SCOtt, or MAry RElief NIles SCOtt, the wife of Emmet H. Scott, a timber producer
Marietta, Ohio — MARIe AntoinETTe plus A
Marmarth, North Dakota — MARgaret MARTHa Fitch, very young granddaughter of A. J. Ealing, railroad president
 Mesena, Georgia — coined by Dr. J. F. Hamilton, using the initial letters of the first names of his six daughters (names unknown)
 Milo, Oklahoma — initials of four daughters of J. W. Johnson (names unknown)
 Mohall, North Dakota — Martin O. HALL, founder and first postmaster
 Mohrland, Utah — four investors in a coal mine: Mays, Orem, Heiner, and Rice plus LAND
 Natal, Oregon — NAThAnieL C. Dale, local landowner and Columbia County clerk
 Nemato, Port Alfred, South Africa — NElson MAndela TOwnship
 Newport, Texas — initials of seven founding families: Norman, Ezell, Welch, Pruitt, Owsley, Reiger, and Turner
Neyami, Georgia — three subdevelopers: NEwton, YAncy, MIlner
 Norvelt, Pennsylvania — EleaNOR RooseVELT
 Pawn, Oregon — local residents who applied for a post office: Poole, Ackerley, Worthington, Nolen
 Peedee, Kentucky — Pumphrey David Smith, landowner
Primghar, Iowa — initials of eight people who had a major part in platting the town: Pumphrey; Roberts; Inman; McCormack; Green; Hayes or Hays; Albright; Rereick or Renck
 Renwer, Manitoba — A. E. WarREN and W. E. Roberts, railway officials
 Reston, Virginia — Robert E. Simon, founder of Reston, plus TON
 Safe, Missouri — possibly early settlers: Shinkle, Aufderheide, Fann, and Essman
 Soda, Texas — initials of four names submitted to the post office (names unknown; now a ghost town)
 Tako, Saskatchewan — homesteaders: Taylor, Aked, Krips, Olsen
 Tamalco, Illinois — W. H. TAylor, John M(A)cLaren, Frank COlwell, prominent locals
 Tejay, Kentucky — Thomas Jefferson Asher, landowner, founder, and judge
Texico, Illinois — TEXas, Illinois, Claybourn, Osborn, the latter two being local family names
 Wahjamega, Michigan — William A. Heartt, James A. Montgomery, and Edgar George Avery
Wascott, Wisconsin — W. A. SCOTT, railroad company president
 Walong, California — W. A. LONG, railroad official
Willows, Saskatchewan — WILliam Gibson LOWeS, owner of the first store
Wimauma, Florida — WIlma, MAUd, MAry, daughters of Captain C. H. Davis, first postmaster

Other places 

 Abac, Georgia — Abraham Baldwin Agricultural College
Alorton, Illinois — ALuminum ORe plus TON
Anzac, Alberta — Australia New Zealand Army Corps
Bacova, Virginia — BAth COunty VirginiA
 Barford, Saskatchewan — BArrier River FORD
Biola, California — Bible Institute Of Los Angeles
Cal-Nev-Ari, Nevada — CALifornia, NEVada, ARIzona
Claycomo, Missouri — CLAY COunty, MissOuri
Covada, Washington — six nearby mines: Columbia, Orin, Verin, Ada, Dora, and Alice
Cudsaskwa Beach, Saskatchewan — CUDworth, SASKatchewan WAkaw
 Denare Beach, Saskatchewan — DEpartment of NAtural REsources
Hico, Missouri — HIckory COunty (although Hico is in Dallas County)
Hocomo, Missouri — HOwell COunty MissOuri
 Ilasco, Missouri — elements and ingredients of cement: Iron, Lime, Aluminum, Silica, Carbon, and Oxygen
 Kenova, West Virginia — KENtucky, Ohio, VirginiA
 Kenora, Ontario — three predecessor communities:  KEewatin, NOrman and RAt Portage
 Lockridge, Oklahoma — Logan, Oklahoma, Canadian, and Kingfisher Counties plus RIDGE
 Macy, Nebraska — (O)MAha AgenCY (location of Indian agency to the Maha or Omaha people)
 Mandaree, North Dakota — MANdan, HiDAtsa and REE, the three tribes whose reservation the place is on. (Ree is another name for the Arikara)
 Molanosa, Saskatchewan — MOntreal LAke, NOrthern SAskatchewan
Nalcrest, Florida — National Association of Letter Carriers plus REST, retirement community for postmen
Noida, Uttar Pradesh — New Okhla Industrial Development Authority
NOLA — A common nickname for New Orleans, LouisianA
Okarche, Oklahoma — OKlahoma ARapaho CHEyenne
Omphghent Township, Illinois — Our Mother of Perpetual Help + GHENT (city in Belgium)
Ovapa, West Virginia — Ohio, VirginiA, PennsylvaniA
Pen Mar, Maryland - PENnsylvania and MARyland
Penowa, Pennsylvania — PENnsylvania, Ohio, West VirginiA
 Sharedon Park, South Africa — Self Help Association of REsidents plus DON, a neighbourhood somewhere in the Cape Town area
 Texarkana, Texas/Arkansas — TEXas ARKansas LouisiANA
 Ti, Oklahoma — a backwards acronym for Indian Territory
 Usna, Oklahoma — United States North America
Usona, Alberta — United States Of North America
 Usona, California — United States Of North America
 Veyo, Utah — either Virtue, Enterprise, Youth, and Order or VErdure and YOuth
 Viropa, West Virginia — VIRginia, Ohio, PennsylvaniA
Walden, Ontario — WAters, Lively, DENison, three of the several communities that merged to form the town
 Wamac, Illinois — WAshington, MArion, and Clinton Counties
 Wyco, West Virginia — WYoming COunty

Neighborhoods 
Many of these names were the result of neighborhood rebranding, first in New York, and then in other cities. The names were mostly coined in imitation of Soho in Manhattan.

New York
 DoBro — DOwntown BROoklyn
Dumbo, Brooklyn — Down Under the Manhattan Bridge Overpass
FiDi — FInancial DIstrict
NoHo, Manhattan — NOrth of HOuston Street
Nolita — NOrth of Little ITAly
NoMad, Manhattan — NOrth of MADison Square Park
Sobro — SOuth BROnx
SoHo, Manhattan — SOuth of HOuston Street
Tribeca — TRIangle BElow CAnal Street

Los Angeles
 DTLA — DownTown Los Angeles
 NoHo — NOrth HOllywood
 SoLA — SOuth Los Angeles
 WeHo — WEst HOllywood

Denver, Colorado
LoDo — LOwer DOwntown
 LoHi — LOwer HIghland
 RiNo — RIver NOrth Art District
 SoBro — SOuth BROadway

Metropolitan and suburban areas 

 Camanava — the Northern Manila District of Metro Manila, Philippines; cities: CAloocan, MAlabon, NAvotas, VAlenzuela
 Gerbangkertosusila — official acronym for the Surabaya Extended Metropolitan Area in East Java, Indonesia: GREsik BANGkalan MojoKERTO SUrabaya SIdoarjo LAmongan
 Jabodetabek — the capital of Indonesia and suburbs: JAkarta, BOgor, DEpok, TAngerang and BEKasi
 Muntapat, Metro Manila, Philippines — three cities:  MUNtinlupa, TAguig, PATeros
 Muntiparlas, Metro Manila, Philippines — three cities: MUNTInlupa, PARañaque, LAS Piñas
 Soweto, Johannesburg, South Africa — SOuth WEstern TOwnships

In other cities
 CARAG, Minneapolis, Minnesota — Calhoun Area Residents' Action Group
NoBo, Traverse City, Michigan — NOrth BOardman Lake District
NoDa, Charlotte, NC — NOrth DAvidson Street
NoMa, Washington, DC — NOrth of MAssachusetts Avenue
NoPa, San Francisco, California — NOrth of the PAnhandle
NuLu, Louisville, Kentucky — a portmanteau of "New" and "Louisville"
Lamasco, Evansville, Indiana — town founders: John and William LAw, James B. MAcCall, Lucius H. SCOtt
 SoBe, Miami Beach, Florida — SOuth BEach
SoBo, Mumbai — SOuth BOmbay
 Sobro, Nashville, Tennessee — SOuth of BROadway
SoDo, Seattle, Washington — originally SOuth of the DOme; now SOuth of DOwntown
SoHo, Hong Kong — SOuth of HOllywood Road
 SoHo, London, Ontario — SOuth of HOrton Street
SoHo (Tampa), Florida — SOuth of HOward Avenue
Soho, West Midlands (Birmingham, England) — SOuth HOuse
SoMa, San Francisco, California — SOuth of MArket Street
 SoMa, Vancouver, British Columbia — SOuth MAin
 SoPi, Paris — SOuth of PIgalle

Natural features

Bodies of water 

 Ayceecee Creek, British Columbia — Alpine Club of Canada (creek draining glaciers on Three Bears Mountain)
 Lake Carasaljo — daughters of Joseph Brick, owner of local Bergen Iron Works: CARrie (A for pronunciation), SALly, and JOsephine
 Lake Chaweva — CHArleston, WEst VirginiA
 Copco Lake, California  — California Oregon Power COmpany
 Emar Lake, Saskatchewan — Eldorado Mining And Refining
Lake Jacomo, Missouri — JAckson COunty, MissOuri
 Owaa Lake, Saskatchewan — Outdoor Writers Association of America (to mark a meeting of that organization in June 1967)
 Sareco Bay, Saskatchewan — SAskatchewan REsearch COuncil; contains Sareco Island
Snafu Lake, Yukon — Situation Normal, All Fucked Up (drained by Snafu Creek); there is also a Snafu Lake in Ontario and a Snafu Creek in Northwest Territories
Swenoda Lake and Swenoda Township, Swift County, Minnesota — SWEdish NOrwegian DAnish, nationalities of settlers in that region
Lake Taneycomo, Missouri — TANEY COunty, MissOuri
Tarfu Lake, Yukon — Things Are Really Fucked Up (fed and drained by Tarfu Creek)
 Lake Wagejo, Michigan — WAlter Koelz, GEorge Stanley, JOhn Brumm, zoologists

Topography 

Delmarva Peninsula — DELaware MARyland VirginiA
 Fasp Mountain, British Columbia — First Aid Ski Patrol
 Isar Mountain, Washington/British Columbia — Internation Search And Rescue
 Multorpor Butte or Mountain —  a mountain near Mount Hood: MULTnomah County, ORegon, PORtland
 Tamu Massif — Texas A&M University; large undersea volcano in the western Pacific named by scientist after the school he taught at
 Ubyssey Glacier, Mount Garibaldi, British Columbia — University of British Columbia
 Veeocee Mountain, British Columbia — Varsity Outdoor Club of the University of British Columbia

Others 

 Alwinsal — potash mine at Guernsey, Saskatchewan named after a French–German consortium that invested: 1) Mines Domanials de Potasse d'ALsace (French) 2) WINtersall AG (German) 3) SALzfuther AG (German)
 Amdewanda No. 630 — school near Eston, Saskatchewan; first trustees: Clyde AMey, Sid DEan, Robert WAmsley plus NDA for alliteration
 Barholis No. 746 — school near Glenbain, Saskatchewan; early settlers: BARnes, HOLmes and InnIS
 Elanco (commonly used name for Eastern Lancaster County School District) — Eastern LANcaster COunty
 6489 Golevka, asteroid named for three observatories that studied it for the Yarkovski effect — GOLdstone Observatory in California; EVpatoria Planetary Radar, Yevpatoria, Ukraine; KAshima Space Technology Center, located in Kashima, Ibaraki, Japan
 Kemoca Park, Montmartre, Saskatchewan — KEndal, MOtmartre, and CAdiac; three communities the park serves
 Mohonasen High School, Rotterdam, New York — MOHawk, ONOndaga, SENeca (with an A replacing the last O), three tribes that once lived in the Rotterdam area
 Odhill railway station, Manitoba — O. D. HILL, K.C.
 Rawebb railway station, Manitoba — RAlph WEBB, politician
 Camp Shagabec, Saskatchewan — church campground for parishes at Shaunavon, Hazenmore, Assinaboia, Govenlock, Abbey, Bracken, Eastend, Consul-Cabri-Climax
 Solanco School District, Lancaster County, Pennsylvania — SOuthern LANcaster COunty
 Viento State Park, near Hood River, Oregon — Henry VIllard, William ENdicott, TOlman

See also
 List of acronyms
 List of airport codes
 List of geographic portmanteaus
 List of geographic anagrams and ananyms

References

acronym
placenames
acronym